The 1995 Badminton World Cup was the seventeenth edition of an international tournament Badminton World Cup. The event was held in Jakarta, Indonesia from 14 to 17 September 1995 with a total prize money of US$180,000. Indonesia won all the titles except the women's singles event, which was won by China.

Medalists

Men's singles

Finals

Women's singles

Finals

Men's doubles

Finals

Women's doubles

Finals

Mixed doubles

Finals

References 

Badminton World Cup
1995 in badminton
1995 in Indonesian sport
Sports competitions in Jakarta
International sports competitions hosted by Indonesia